Geehi Dam is a major ungated rockfill embankment dam across the Geehi River in the Snowy Mountains of New South Wales, Australia. The reservoir impounded by the dam is known as Geehi Reservoir.

History
The structure was completed by Thiess Brothers in 1966, and is one of the sixteen major dams that comprise the Snowy Mountains Scheme, a vast hydroelectricity and irrigation complex constructed in south-east Australia between 1949 and 1974 that is now run by Snowy Hydro.

Location and features
The dam is located within what is now the Snowy Valleys local government area. It was constructed by Thiess Bros based on engineering plans developed under contract by the Snowy Mountains Hydroelectric Authority.

At 100% capacity the dam wall holds back  of water.

Power generation

Geehi Reservoir receives water from Island Bend Pondage through the Snowy-Geehi tunnel. The outlet structure for the Snowy-Geehi tunnel is shared with the intake of the Murray 1 pressure tunnel and is accessible by a suspended footbridge.

See also

 Kosciuszko National Park
 List of dams and reservoirs in New South Wales
 Snowy Hydro Limited
 Snowy Mountains Scheme
 Snowy Scheme Museum

References

External links
 

Snowy Mountains Scheme
Rock-filled dams
Dams in New South Wales
Dams completed in 1966
Kosciuszko National Park
Murray-Darling basin